Amar Praner Priya is a 2009 Dhallywood Bengali romantic comedy film directed by Zakir Hossain Raju. The film was released on September 20, 2009, on Eid ul-Fitr and went on to become a box-office success in Bangladesh, primarily noted for its soundtrack & choreography. The film stars Shakib Khan, Mim and Misha Sawdagor, Prabir Mitra, Rehana Jolly, Khaleda Akter Kolpona and many more.

Plot
Prem (Shakib Khan) always helps a lot of people, specially cases with love trouble. That's why people named him "LOVE GURU". But he does not love any girl, then he accidentally meets Priyanka (Mim) and falls in love with her. Initially, Priyanka does not reciprocate Prem's feeling because Prem is a son of a very rich businessman. Priyanka does not like rich people. But when Prem proves in many ways that his love for her is pure and very real, Priyanka could not refuse him. When they slowly start dating, Priyanka's brother, (Misha Sawdagor) becomes an obstacle between them. Priyanka's brother considers Prem as an enemy since his mother was killed by Prem in a road accident. It was just an accident, but her brother convinces Priyanka that it was all intentional. Priyanka  misunderstands  Prem and tries to take revenge. But one day Priyanka realizes her mistake in accusing Prem, he is innocent and her brother is the main culprit who is coming between their relationship. Then she calls Prem and clears their misunderstanding. So heroically Prem comes and takes his bride away from her evil and conspicuous brother.

Cast
 Shakib Khan as Prem
 Bidya Sinha Mim as Priyanka
 Misha Sawdagor as Priyanka's brother
 Khaleda Aktar Kolpona as Priyanka's mother
 Prabir Mitra as Prem's father
 Rehana Jolly as Prem's mother
 Kabila
 Nasrin
 Chikon Ali
 Md Jakir Hossain (Actor) as police

Soundtrack 

The soundtrack of Amar Praner Priya was composed by Hridoy Khan, Tishma and Ali Akram Shuvo.

Track listing

Accolades

Meril Prothom Alo Award 2009
Nominated: Best Actor is Shakib Khan
Nominated: Best Actress is Mim Bidya Sinha Saha
Nominated: Best Singer is Hridoy Khan for Chaina Meye Tumi

Uro-CJFB Performance Award 2009
Won: Best Movie – Amar Praner Priya
Won: Best Actor – Shakib Khan

Film Award Bangla (FAB 2010)
Also known as "Epar Bangla and Opar Bangla" film award
Won: Best Actress – Mim Bidya Sinha Saha
Nominated: Best Actor – Shakib Khan

National Film Award 2009
Won Best Choreographer – Tanjil Alam

References

2009 films
2009 romantic comedy films
Bengali-language Bangladeshi films
Bangladeshi romantic comedy films
Films scored by Ali Akram Shuvo
Films scored by Hridoy Khan
2000s Bengali-language films
Films directed by Zakir Hossain Raju